The beaver is a large semiaquatic rodent.

Beaver or The Beaver may also refer to:

Arts, entertainment and media

Fictional characters
 Beaver Cleaver, in Leave It to Beaver (1957–1963)
 Cassidy Casablancas, known as Beaver, in Veronica Mars
 Beaver, in Franklin
 Tony Beaver, in American folklore
 Mr. and Mrs. Beaver, in the Chronicles of Narnia
 Goodman Beaver, a comics character 
 Beaver, in webcomic Beaver and Steve

Literature
 The Beaver (newspaper), the London School of Economics student newspaper
 The Beaver, now Canada's History magazine
 Oakville Beaver, a community newspaper in Oakville, Ontario, Canada

Other uses in arts and entertainment
 Beaver (band), a stoner rock band from the Netherlands
 The Beaver (film), a 2011 dark comedy
 The Beaver Trilogy, a 2001 documentary film
 Beavers (film),a 1988 IMAX documentary
 The Beaver, the name of the Canadian Comedy Awards trophy
 Beaver, an optional gambling rule in backgammon

Businesses and organisations
 Beaver College, now Arcadia University, in Glenside, Pennsylvania, U.S.
 Beaver Country Day School, in Chestnut Hill, Massachusetts, U.S.
 Beaver Group, a British technology company
 Beaver Local High School, a public high school in  St. Clair Township, Ohio, U.S.
 Beaver Motorcoach Corporation, a defunct American motor coach manufacturer

People
 Beaver (surname), including a list of people with the name
 Beavers (surname), including a list of people with the name
 Beaver (singer) (Beverley Jean Morrison, 1950–2010), a New Zealand jazz singer 
 Dane-zaa, historically known as the Beaver tribe, a First Nations people in Canada
 Beaver First Nation, or the Beavers, a Canadian First Nation government or band
 Dane-zaa language, once known as Beaver
 Beaver Harris (William Godvin Harris, 1936–1991), an American jazz drummer
 Steve Menzies (b. 1973), nicknamed Beaver, an Australian rugby league footballer

Places
 Beaver Island (disambiguation)
 Beaver Lake (disambiguation)
 Beaver River (disambiguation)

Antarctica
 Beaver Glacier (Enderby Land)
 Beaver Glacier (Ross Ice Shelf)

Canada
 Beaver County, Alberta
 Beaver Cove (British Columbia)
 Beaver Lakes (Annapolis), two lakes
 Beaver Mountain (British Columbia), Selkirk Mountains
 Beaver Valley (Ontario)

United States
 Beaver, Alaska
 Beaver, Arkansas
 Beaver City, Indiana, an unincorporated community
 Beaver, Iowa
 Beaver, Kansas
 Beaver, Kentucky
 Beaver, Beaver Township, Bay County, Michigan
 Beaver, Baldwin Township, Delta County, Michigan
 Beaver, Minnesota
 Beaver City, Nebraska
 Beaver, Ohio
 Beaver, Oklahoma
 Beaver County, Oklahoma
 Beaver, Oregon
 Beaver, Pennsylvania
 Beaver County, Pennsylvania
 Beaver, Utah
Beaver County, Utah
 Beaver, Washington
 Beaver, West Virginia  
 Beaver, Clark County, Wisconsin
 Beaver, Marinette County, Wisconsin
 Beaver (community), Marinette County, Wisconsin
 Beaver, Polk County, Wisconsin
 Beaver Mountain, in Utah
 Beaver National Forest, in Utah
 Beaver Township (disambiguation)

Sports
 Bemidji State Beavers, athletic teams of Bemidji State University, Minnesota, U.S.
 Oregon State Beavers, athletic teams of Oregon State University, U.S.
 Benny Beaver, the mascot of Oregon State University
 Portland Beavers, baseball teams representing Portland, Oregon, U.S.
 Beaver Stadium, in University Park, Pennsylvania, U.S.
Weyburn Beavers, baseball team in the Western Canadian Baseball League

Transportation
 Beaver (armored bridgelayer vehicle), a variant of the Leopard 1 tank
 Beaver (ship), the name of several ships 
 De Havilland Canada DHC-2 Beaver, an aircraft
 Plaxton Beaver, a minibus body
 Spectrum Beaver, a family of ultralight aircraft
 Type 93A Beaver, a bomber version of the Bristol Boarhound aircraft, first flown in 1927
 Beaver, a passenger train operated by the Southern Pacific Railroad
 Beaver Rover, a proposed Mars rover, part of the Northern Light (spacecraft) design

Other uses
 Beavers (Scouting), scouting for young children, usually aged 5–7
 Beaver, an alternative spelling of bevor, a piece of medieval armour protecting the neck
 Beaver, term confused with bevor to refer to the visor of a medieval military helmet
 Mountain beaver, a North American rodent not closely related to the beaver

See also

 Beaver Airport (disambiguation)
 Beaver Bridge (disambiguation)
 Beaver Brook (disambiguation)
 Beaver City (disambiguation)
 Beaver Creek (disambiguation)
 Beaver Dam (disambiguation)
 Beaver Falls (disambiguation)
 Beaver tail (disambiguation)
 Beaver Valley (disambiguation)
 Beaverdam Creek (disambiguation)
 Beaverton (disambiguation)
 Beavertown (disambiguation)
 Beaverville (disambiguation)
 Eager beaver (disambiguation)
 Beaver v R, a notable decision of the Supreme Court of Canada
 Beaver fraternal orders
 Beaver hat, a hat made from felted beaver fur
 Beevers, a surname
 Belvoir (disambiguation), a homophone used for names and locations
 Busy beaver, a game in theoretical computer science
 Made beaver, a unit of account used in the Hudson's Bay Company